Yukon (formerly called Yukon Territory and also referred to as the Yukon) is the smallest and westernmost of Canada's three territories. It also is the second-least populated province or territory in Canada, with a population of 43,964 as of March 2022. Whitehorse, the territorial capital, is the largest settlement in any of the three territories.

Yukon was split from the North-West Territories in 1898 as the Yukon Territory. The federal government's Yukon Act, which received royal assent on March 27, 2002, established "Yukon" as the territory's official name, though Yukon Territory is also still popular in usage and Canada Post continues to use the territory's internationally approved postal abbreviation of YT.  In 2021,  territorial government policy was changed so that “The Yukon” would be recommended for use in official territorial government materials.

Though officially bilingual (English and French), the Yukon government also recognizes First Nations languages.

At , Yukon's Mount Logan, in Kluane National Park and Reserve, is the highest mountain in Canada and the second-highest on the North American continent (after Denali in the U.S. state of Alaska). Most of the Yukon has a subarctic climate, characterized by long, cold winters and brief, warm summers. The coastal area along the Arctic Ocean has a tundra climate.

Notable rivers include the Yukon River as well as the Pelly, Stewart, Peel, White, Liard, and Tatshenshini rivers.

Etymology
The territory is named after the Yukon River, the longest river in Yukon. The name itself is from a contraction of the words in the Gwich'in phrase chųų gąįį han, which means white water river and refers to "the pale colour" of glacial runoff in the Yukon River.

Geography

The territory is the approximate shape of a right triangle, bordering the U.S. state of Alaska to the west and northwest for  mostly along longitude 141° W, the Northwest Territories to the east and British Columbia to the south mostly along latitude 60° N. Its northern coast is on the Beaufort Sea. Its ragged eastern boundary mostly follows the divide between the Yukon Basin and the Mackenzie River drainage basin to the east in the Mackenzie mountains.

Most of the territory is in the watershed of its namesake, the Yukon River. The southern Yukon is dotted with a large number of large, long and narrow glacier-fed alpine lakes, most of which flow into the Yukon River system. The larger lakes include Teslin Lake, Atlin Lake, Tagish Lake, Marsh Lake, Lake Laberge, Kusawa Lake and Kluane Lake. Bennett Lake on the Klondike Gold Rush trail is a lake flowing into Nares Lake, with the greater part of its area within Yukon. Other watersheds in the territory include the Mackenzie River, the Peel Watershed and the Alsek–Tatshenshini, and a number of rivers flowing directly into the Beaufort Sea. The two main Yukon rivers flowing into the Mackenzie in the Northwest Territories are the Liard River in the southeast and the Peel River and its tributaries in the northeast.

Canada's highest point, Mount Logan, is in the territory's southwest. Mount Logan and a large part of the Yukon's southwest are in Kluane National Park and Reserve, a UNESCO World Heritage Site. Other national parks include Ivvavik National Park and Vuntut National Park in the north.

Notable widespread tree species within the Yukon are the black spruce and white spruce. Many trees are stunted because of the short growing season and severe climate.

Climate

While the average winter temperature in the Yukon is mild by Canadian arctic standards, no other place in North America gets as cold as the Yukon during extreme cold snaps. The temperature has dropped down to  three times, 1947, 1952, and 1968.

Unlike most of Canada where the most extreme heat waves occur in July, August, and even September, the Yukon's extreme heat tends to occur in June and even May. The Yukon has recorded  three times.

History

Long before the arrival of Europeans, central and southern Yukon was populated by First Nations people, and the area escaped glaciation. Sites of archeological significance in the Yukon hold some of the earliest evidence of the presence of human habitation in North America. The sites safeguard the history of the first people and the earliest First Nations of the Yukon.

The volcanic eruption of Mount Churchill in approximately 800 AD in what is now the U.S. state of Alaska blanketed the southern Yukon with a layer of ash which can still be seen along the Klondike Highway, and which forms part of the oral tradition of First Nations peoples in the Yukon and further south in Canada.

Coastal and inland First Nations had extensive trading networks. European incursions into the area began early in the 19th century with the fur trade, followed by missionaries. By the 1870s and 1880s, gold miners began to arrive. This drove a population increase that justified the establishment of a police force, just in time for the start of the Klondike Gold Rush in 1897. The increased population coming with the gold rush led to the separation of the Yukon district from the Northwest Territories and the formation of the separate Yukon Territory in 1898.

Demographics

The 2016 census reported a Yukon population of 35,874, an increase of 5.7% from 2011. Statistics Canada has estimated Yukon's 2022 Q4 population to be 43,964, an increase of 17.5% from the 2016 census. This is the largest percentage increase for any Canadian province or territory.

Unlike in other Canadian provinces and territories, Statistics Canada uses the entire territory as a single at-large census division.

Ethnicity

According to the 2016 Canada Census the majority of the territory's population was of European descent, although it has a significant population of First Nations communities across the territory. The 2011 National Household Survey examined the Yukon's ethnocultural diversity and immigration. At that time, 87.7% of residents were Canadian-born and 24.2% were of Indigenous origin. The most common countries of birth for immigrants were the United Kingdom (15.9%), the Philippines (15.0%), and the United States (13.2%). Among very recent immigrants (between 2006 and 2011) living in the Yukon, 63.5% were born in Asia.

As of the 2016 census, the top ten ancestries in the Yukon were:

Language
The most commonly reported mother tongue among the 33,145 single responses to the 2011 Canadian census was English at 28,065. The second-most common was 1,455 for French. Among 510 multiple respondents, 140 of them reported a mother tongue of both English and French, while 335 reported English and a " language" and 20 reported French and a " language".

The Yukon's Language Act "recognises the significance" of the territory's aboriginal languages in the Yukon, and permits their use in Legislative Assembly proceedings, although only English and French are available for laws and court proceedings.

Religion

The 2021 Canadian census reported that 59.7% of Yukoners reported having no religious affiliation, the highest percentage in Canada. The most frequently reported religious affiliation was Christianity, reported by 46.2% of residents, followed by Sikhism at 1.0%.

Economy

The Yukon's major industry is mining (lead, zinc, silver, gold, asbestos and copper). The government acquired the land from the Hudson's Bay Company in 1870 and split it from the Northwest Territories in 1898 to fill the need for local government created by the population influx of the gold rush. Thousands of these prospectors moved to the territory, ushering a period of Yukon history recorded by authors such as Robert W. Service and Jack London. The memory of this period and the early days of the Royal Canadian Mounted Police, as well as the territory's scenic wonders and outdoor recreation opportunities, makes tourism the second most important industry in the territory.

Manufacturing, including furniture, clothing, and handicrafts, follows in importance, along with hydroelectricity. The traditional industries of trapping and fishing have declined. As of 2012, the government sector directly employs approximately 6,300 out of a labour force of 20,800, on a population of 27,500.

On May 1, 2015, the Yukon modified its Business Corporations Act, in an effort to attract more benefits and participants to its economy. One amendment to the BCA lets a proxy be given for voting purposes. Another change will allow directors to pursue business opportunities declined by the corporation, a practice off-limits in most other jurisdictions due to the inherent potential for conflicts of interest. One of the changes will allow a corporation to serve as a director of a subsidiary registered in Yukon. The legislation also allows companies to add provisions in their articles of incorporation giving directors blanket approval to sell off all of the company's assets without requiring a shareholder vote. If provided for by a unanimous shareholders agreement, a corporation is not required to have directors at all. There is increased flexibility regarding the location of corporate records offices, including the ability to maintain a records office outside of Yukon so long as it is accessible by electronic means.

Tourism

The Yukon's tourism motto is "Larger than life". The Yukon's tourism relies heavily on its natural environment, and there are many organized outfitters and guides available for activities such as but not limited to hunting, angling, canoeing/kayaking, hiking, skiing, snowboarding, ice climbing, and dog sledding. These activities are offered both in an organized setting or in the backcountry, which is accessible by air or snowmobile. The Yukon's festivals and sporting events include the Adäka Cultural Festival, Yukon International Storytelling Festival, and the Yukon Sourdough Rendezvous. The Yukon's latitude enables the view of aurora borealis.

The Yukon Government maintains a series of territorial parks including, parks such as Herschel Island Qikiqtaruk Territorial Park, Tombstone Territorial Park, and Fishing Branch Ni'iinlii'njik Park. Coal River Springs Territorial Park) Parks Canada, a federal agency of the Government of Canada, also maintains three national parks and reserves within the territory, Kluane National Park and Reserve, Ivvavik National Park, and Vuntut National Park. 

The Yukon is also home to 12 National Historic Sites of Canada. The sites are also administered by Parks Canada, with five of the 12 sites being located within national parks. The territory is host to a number of museums, including the Copperbelt Railway & Mining Museum, the SS Klondike boat museum, the Yukon Beringia Interpretive Centre in Whitehorse; as well as the Keno City Mining Museum in Keno City. The territory also holds a number of enterprises that allows tourists to experience pre-colonial and modern cultures of Yukon's First Nations and Inuit.

Culture
The Yukon has a wide array of cultural and sporting events that attract artists, local residents, and tourists. Annual events include the Adäka Cultural Festival, Dawson City Music Festival, Yukon International Storytelling Festival, Yukon Quest dog sled race, Yukon Sourdough Rendezvous, as well as Klondike Gold Rush memorials. and the Northern Lights Centre.

The Yukon's Aboriginal culture is also strongly reflected in such areas as winter sports, as in the Yukon Quest sled dog race. The modern comic-book character Yukon Jack depicts a heroic aboriginal persona. Similarly, the territorial government also recognizes that First Nations and Inuit languages plays a part in cultural heritage of the territory; these languages include Tlingit, and the less common Tahltan, as well as seven Athapaskan languages, Upper Tanana, Gwich'in, Hän, Northern Tutchone, Southern Tutchone, Kaska, and Tagish, some of which are rare.

Arts

Notable Yukon artists include Jim Robb and Ted Harrison, whose paintings have become iconic for their depictions of historic and contemporary life and culture in the Yukon.

With the Klondike Gold Rush, a number of folk songs from the Yukon became popular, including "Rush to the Klondike" (1897, written by W. T. Diefenbaker), "The Klondike Gold Rush", "I've Got the Klondike Fever" (1898) and "La Chanson du Klondyke".

A notable cultural and tourist feature is the legacy of the Klondike Gold Rush (1897–1899), which inspired contemporary writers of the time such as Jack London, Robert W. Service, and Jules Verne, and which continues to inspire films and games, such as Mae West's Klondike Annie and The Yukon Trail .

Government

Yukon Legislature

Executive power in the Yukon is formally vested in the Territorial Commissioner, who plays an analogous role to that of a provincial lieutenant governor.  As guarantor of responsible government in the territory, the Commissioner generally acts on the advice of the Premier of Yukon, who commands the confidence of the elected Legislative Assembly.  Unlike lieutenant governors, commissioners are not direct representatives of the King but are instead appointed by the federal government.

The Yukon has numerous political parties and candidates who stand for election to the 19 seats in the Yukon Legislative Assembly. Those elected to the legislature are known as members of the Legislative Assembly and may use the post nominal letters "MLA". The three parties presently represented are the centre-leaning Yukon Liberal Party (8 seats) – who currently form government, the centre-right leaning Yukon Party (8), and the centre-left leaning Yukon New Democratic Party (3).

The 10th and current premier of Yukon is Ranj Pillai, who represents the electoral district of Porter Creek South as its MLA. Pillai took office on January 14, 2023. After the 2021 Yukon general election, the Liberals were reduced to a minority government, though they were able to continue governing due to a formal agreement with the NDP.

Local government

The vast majority of Yukon's land mass is unorganized, with no defined municipal or otherwise supralocal level of government like in other parts of Canada.

For most individuals in the Yukon though, local level governance is provided by municipalities.

Municipal governments are created by the Yukon Government in accordance with the Municipal Act of 2001. Municipal governments provide "jurisdiction services, facilities, or things that a local government considers necessary or desirable for all or part of its community". Classifications of municipalities under the Municipal Act include cities and towns. Whitehorse is the capital of the Yukon and its only city. The remaining seven municipalities are towns, of which four were villages that were continued as towns upon adoption of the 2001 Municipal Act.

The usage is somewhat confusing: according to the Municipal Act of 2001 villages are legally given the status of towns, but may call themselves villages in English. In French they are called villages, and the French word ville, which means town is not used for them. Instead larger settlements are called ville and even bigger ones grande ville, apart from Dawson which is called a cité, and in English is also called a city. Keno City, though unincorporated, also bears city in its name.

History
In the 19th century, the Yukon was a segment of North-Western Territory that was administered by the Hudson's Bay Company, and then of the Northwest Territories administered by the federal Canadian government. It only obtained a recognizable local government in 1895 when it became a separate district of the Northwest Territories. In 1898, it was made a separate territory with its own commissioner and an appointed Territorial Council.

Prior to 1979, the territory was administered by the commissioner who was appointed by the federal Minister of Indian Affairs and Northern Development. The commissioner had a role in appointing the territory's Executive Council, served as chair, and had a day-to-day role in governing the territory. The elected Territorial Council had a purely advisory role. In 1979, a significant degree of power was devolved from the commissioner and the federal government to the territorial legislature which, in that year, adopted a party system of responsible government. This change was accomplished through a letter from Jake Epp, Minister of Indian Affairs and Northern Development, rather than through formal legislation.

In preparation for responsible government, political parties were organized and ran candidates to the Yukon Legislative Assembly for the first time in 1978. The Progressive Conservatives won these elections and formed the first party government of Yukon in January 1979. The Yukon New Democratic Party (NDP) formed the government from 1985 to 1992 under Tony Penikett and again from 1996 under Piers McDonald until being defeated in 2000. The conservatives returned to power in 1992 under John Ostashek after having renamed themselves the Yukon Party. The Liberal government of Pat Duncan was defeated in elections in November 2002, with Dennis Fentie of the Yukon Party forming the government as premier.

The Yukon Act, passed on April 1, 2003, formalized the powers of the Yukon Government and devolved additional powers to the territorial government (e.g., control over land and natural resources). As of 2003, other than criminal prosecutions, the Yukon Government has much of the same powers as provincial governments, and the other two territories are looking to obtaining the same powers.

Federal representation

At the federal level, the Yukon is represented in the Parliament of Canada by one member of Parliament (MP) and one senator. MPs from Canadian territories are full and equal voting representatives and residents of the territory enjoy the same rights as other Canadian citizens. One Yukon MP, Erik Nielsen, served as Deputy Prime Minister under Brian Mulroney, while another, Audrey McLaughlin, was the leader of the federal New Democratic Party (NDP) from 1989 to 1995.

First Nations

A substantial minority of the territory's population is First Nations. An umbrella land claim agreement representing 7,432 members of 14 different First Nations was signed with the federal government in 1993. Eleven of the 14 Yukon First Nations have negotiated and signed comprehensive land claim and self-government agreements. The 14 First Nations speak eight different languages.

The territory once had an Inuit settlement, located on Herschel Island off the Arctic Ocean coast. This settlement was dismantled in 1987 and its inhabitants relocated to the neighbouring Northwest Territories. As a result of the Inuvialuit Final Agreement, the island is now a territorial park and is known officially as Qikiqtaruk Territorial Park, Qikiqtaruk being the name of the island in Inuvialuktun.

Transportation
Before modern forms of transportation, the rivers and mountain passes were the main transportation routes for the coastal Tlingit people trading with the Athabascans of which the Chilkoot Pass and Dalton Trail, as well as the first Europeans.

Air

Erik Nielsen Whitehorse International Airport serves as the air transport infrastructure hub, with scheduled direct flights to Vancouver, Victoria, Kelowna, Calgary, Edmonton, Yellowknife, Inuvik, Ottawa, Dawson City, Old Crow, Juneau and Frankfurt (pre-COVID). Whitehorse International Airport is also the headquarters and primary hub for Air North, Yukon's Airline. Every Yukon community is served by an airport or community aerodrome. The communities of Dawson City and Old Crow have regularly scheduled service through Air North. Air charter businesses exist primarily to serve the tourism and mining exploration industries.

Rail

The railway ceased operation in the 1980s with the first closure of the Faro mine. It is now run during the summer months for the tourism season, with operations between Carcross and Skagway, Alaska.

The Alaska-Alberta Railway Development Corporation (A2A) is planning to construct a new railway line that would cross the Yukon, connecting Watson Lake and possibly Carmacks but not Whitehorse.

Roads

Today, major land routes include the Alaska Highway, the Klondike Highway (between Skagway and Dawson City), the Haines Highway (between Haines, Alaska, and Haines Junction), and the Dempster Highway (linking Inuvik, Northwest Territories to the Klondike Highway, and the only road access route to the Arctic Ocean, in Canada), all paved except for the Dempster. Other highways with less traffic include the Robert Campbell Highway linking Carmacks (on the Klondike Highway) to Watson Lake (Alaska Highway) via Faro and Ross River, and the Silver Trail linking the old silver mining communities of Mayo, Elsa and Keno City to the Klondike Highway at the Stewart River bridge. Air travel is the only way to reach the far-north community of Old Crow.

Waterways
From the Gold Rush until the 1950s, riverboats plied the Yukon River, mostly between Whitehorse and Dawson City, with some making their way further to Alaska and over to the Bering Sea, and other tributaries of the Yukon River such as the Stewart River. Most of the riverboats were owned by the British-Yukon Navigation Company, an arm of the White Pass and Yukon Route, which also operated a narrow gauge railway between Skagway, Alaska, and Whitehorse.

See also

 Outline of Yukon

Notes

References

Further reading

External links

 
 Yukon Attraction & Service Guides
 

 
1898 establishments in Canada
Census divisions of the Canadian territories
Beaufort Sea
States and territories established in 1898
1898 establishments in Yukon
Beringia
Arctic Ocean
Provinces and territories of Canada